Kottappadam (Kottoppadam) is a gram panchayat in the Palakkad district, state of Kerala, India. It is a local government organisation that serves the villages of Kottoppadam-I, Kottoppadam-II and Kottoppadam-III.

References 

Gram panchayats in Palakkad district